Theretra papuensis is a moth of the  family Sphingidae. It is known from Pantar in New Guinea.

References

Theretra
Moths described in 2009